The equipment of the Malaysian Armed Forces can be subdivided into: infantry weapon, heavy equipment and attire.

Infantry weapon

Heavy equipment

Malaysian Army

Malaysian Army Aviation

Royal Malaysian Navy

Royal Malaysian Navy Aviation

Royal Malaysian Air Force

Attire

See also
 List of equipment of the Malaysian Army
 List of equipment of the Royal Malaysian Navy
 List of equipment of the Royal Malaysian Air Force
 List of aircraft of the Malaysian Armed Forces
 List of equipment of the Malaysian Maritime Enforcement Agency
 List of vehicles of the Royal Malaysian Police
 List of police firearms in Malaysia

References

Military equipment of Malaysia
Malaysia